Mat Noron (born 17 June 1998), is a Cambodian footballer currently playing as a forward for Boeung Ket in the Cambodian League, and the Cambodia national team

Career statistics

International

References

External links
 

1998 births
Living people
Cambodian footballers
Cambodia international footballers
Sportspeople from Phnom Penh
Association football forwards